Sindos railway station is a railway station that serves the suburb of Sindos in the municipality of Delta, Thessaloniki regional unit, Greece. Opened on 9 September 2007, along with the suburban railway. The station is served by Regional stopping services Florina, Kalambaka, Palaiofarsalos and Thessaloniki, and since 9 September 2007 by Proastiakos Thessaloniki services to Larissa, Edessa, and Thessaloniki. In the future, the station will join the Thessaloniki Metro through an extension from NSSTH and Kordelio. The old station building will house the museum of the Balkan Games.

History
Opened in 1877 in what was then the Ottoman Empire, by the Société du Chemin de Fer ottoman Salonique-Monastir, a branchline of the Chemins de fer Orientaux from Thessaloniki to Bitola. During this period Northern Greece and the southern Balkans were still under Ottoman rule. Sindos was annexed by Greece on 18 October 1912 during the First Balkan War. On 17 October 1925, The Greek government purchased the Greek sections of the former Salonica Monastir railway and the railway became part of the Hellenic State Railways, with the remaining section north of Florina seeded to Yugoslavia.

In 1970 OSE became the legal successor to the SEK, taking over responsibilities for most of Greece's rail infrastructure. On 1 January 1971 the station and most of Greek rail infrastructure where transferred to the Hellenic Railways Organisation S.A., a state-owned corporation. Freight traffic declined sharply when the state-imposed monopoly of OSE for the transport of agricultural products and fertilisers ended in the early 1990s. Many small stations of the network with little passenger traffic were closed down. In 2001 the infrastructure element of OSE was created, known as GAIAOSE, it would henceforth be responsible for the maintenance of stations, bridges and other elements of the network, as well as the leasing and the sale of railway assists. In 2003, OSE launched "Proastiakos SA", as a subsidiary to serve the operation of the suburban network in the urban complex of Athens during the 2004 Olympic Games. In 2005, TrainOSE was created as a brand within OSE to concentrate on rail services and passenger interface.

On 9 September 2007, the station reopened. Since 2007, the station is served by the Proastiakos Thessaloniki services to New Railway Station. In 2009, with the Greek debt crisis unfolding OSE's Management was forced to reduce services across the network. Timetables were cut back, and routes closed as the government-run entity attempted to reduce overheads. In 2008, all Proastiakos were transferred from OSE to TrainOSE. the following year, in 2017 OSE's passenger transport sector was privatised as TrainOSE, currently a wholly owned subsidiary of Ferrovie dello Stato Italiane infrastructure, including stations, remained under the control of OSE.

Facilities
The station is still housed in the original 19th-century brick-built station building. As of (2020) the station is unstaffed, with no staffed booking office. However, there are waiting rooms. Access to the platforms is via a subway under the lines, with wheelchair accessible by elevator. The platforms have shelters with seating. However, there are no Dot-matrix display departure and arrival screens or timetable poster boards on the platforms. The station, however, has a buffet called POYΦ. There is also a taxi rank and Parking in the forecourt, and infrequent buses do call at the station.

Services
The station is served the following lines of the Thessaloniki Proastiakos or suburban railway:

 Thessaloniki - Larissa with 1 tph. (transfer to Regional, Express & InterCity services at Thessaloniki).

 Thessaloniki - Florina with 1 tph. (transfer to Regional, Express & InterCity services at Thessaloniki).

The station is served the following TrainOSE services:

 Regional services to Palaiofarsalos and Thessaloniki.
 Express services to Kalambaka and Thessaloniki.

The station is also served by local buses: (All services are accessible from the forecourt).

Station layout

References

Railway stations in Central Macedonia
Railway stations opened in 1877
Buildings and structures in Thessaloniki
1877 establishments in the Ottoman Empire